Linear is the name of the debut studio album by the pop/freestyle group Linear. It was released on March 21, 1990, by Atlantic Records.
The album's first single, Sending All My Love, reached #5 on the Billboard Hot 100 making the album itself reach #52 on the Billboard 200. It also won a Gold certificate the same year, for selling more than five hundred thousand copies in the United States. The second single, "Don't You Come Cryin'", did not repeat the success of the previous single - though it achieved some prominence, reaching the 70th spot on the Billboard Hot 100 list. The album's last single, "Something Going On", failed to succeed.

Track listing 
All songs written by Charlie Pennachio, except track 2 (Pennachio, Charles Christopher) and 4 & 9 (Pennachio, Tolga Katas, Wyatt Pauley).

Personnel 
Linear
 Charlie Pennachio – lead vocals, backing vocals 
 Wyatt "Riot" Pauley – guitars, vocals 
 Joey "Bang" Restivo – percussion, vocals, rap (4, 6)

Additional musicians
 Tolga Katas – keyboards, backing vocals 
 Phillip Conneilly – guitars, backing vocals 
 Todd Kelly – drums 
 Charles Christopher – backing vocals 
 Maria Mendez – backing vocals 
 Gene Minix – backing vocals
 Cheri Puccini – backing vocals 
 Dawn Rix – backing vocals

Production 
 Tolga Katas – producer
 Phil Jones – additional production (1, 10)
 Todd Adler – executive producer (1, 10)
 Steven Robillard – engineer 
 Jamie Swartz – engineer
 Cesar Sogbe – engineer 
 Debbie DeNesse – assistant engineer 
 Damon Stewart – assistant engineer  
 Dennis King – mastering at  Atlantic Studios (New York City, New York)
 Bob Defrin – art direction 
 Anthony Ranieri – design 
 David Vance – photography

Charts

Singles - Billboard (North America)

References

1990 debut albums
Linear (group) albums
Atlantic Records albums